Elizabeth M. Coggs (born 1956; also known as Elizabeth Coggs-Jones and Beth) is a Wisconsin Democratic politician. She served on the Milwaukee County Board of Supervisors as county supervisor for the 10th district from 1988-2010, and was from 2011-2012 a member of the Wisconsin State Assembly, succeeding Annette Polly Williams.

Background
Elizabeth Monette Coggs was born in Milwaukee, Wisconsin.  Coggs is a lifelong Milwaukee resident. Her father, Isaac Newton Coggs, was one of the third African-Americans elected to the State Assembly (in 1952) and the first African American elected to the Milwaukee County Board of Supervisors (in 1964). Her mother, Marcia Priscilla Young Coggs, was the first African-American woman elected to assembly of the Wisconsin Legislature (in 1976). Elizabeth graduated from Lincoln High School, and earned a Bachelor of Arts degree, majoring in African-American studies at the University of Wisconsin-Milwaukee. Elizabeth continues the family tradition of serving in elective office which has spanned generations. Issac Coggs, Elizabeth's father, was one of the third African Americans elected to the State Assembly in 1952 and served until 1963.  In 1964 he was elected as the first African American  SupMilwaukee County Boardervisor.   Marcia P. Coggs, Elizabeth's mother, served in the Assembly from 1977 to 1991. Spencer Coggs served as State Representative, State Senator and now City of Milwaukee treasure and Leon Young, served as a Wisconsin State Representative for over thirty years, retiring in 2019. Elizabeth's Aunt Verdis J. Young Robinson was the first African American female to serve in both the Wyandotte County Commissioner of Kansas City, Kansas and also the first African American woman to be elected the State of Kansans Legislature.  State Representative Broderick Henderson is Elizabeth's cousin also and he presently serves in the Kansas Legislature.  Lastly Milele A. Coggs is serving for eleven years as a City of Milwaukee Alderwoman, elected in 2008 and presently is Chairwoman of the powerful Finance Committee for the city of Milwaukee; all of these who are Elizabeth's relatives, currently serve in the Assembly and Senate.

Both Issac and Marcia Coggs have had county and health  buildings named after them in Milwaukee. The Milwaukee County Human Services Center is named after Marcia Coggs and the Milwaukee Health Services has named the Isaac Coggs Health Center is named in his honor.  The Coggs Living Legacy continues, started by Isaac Newton Coggs in 1952, that is one of the only African American Family serving the public through elected and political service in the United States with over 150 years of collective elective leadership for African Americans in Wisconsin and Kansas.

Politics

Milwaukee County Board
She was first elected a county supervisor in 1988, being re-elected from 1992-2008. As of 2010 she was the longest-serving member of the County Board.

State Assembly
In 2010 she defeated two other candidates, Stephanie Findley and Sherman Hill to win the primary election for the State Assembly, in the 10th District after Annette Polly Williams announced that she was not running for election.

Her only opponent was independent Ieshuh Griffin, who attracted national attention (including an appearance on The Daily Show) for eventually unsuccessful efforts to label herself as "NOT the 'whiteman's bitch'" (utilizing a state rule that allows independent candidates to use a five-word statement of purpose on the ballot to categorize themselves) on the election ballot. Coggs received 15,874 votes; Griffin 1223.

2010
See also: Wisconsin State Assembly elections, 2010
Coggs defeated Independent Ieshuh Griffin in the November 2 general election. Coggs was opposed in the primary election by Stephanie Findley and Sherman Hill.[7]

Wisconsin State Assembly, District 10 General Election (2010)

Candidates	Votes		
Elizabeth Coggs (D)
15,874		
Ieshuh Griffin (I)	1,223	
	
Wisconsin State Assembly, District 10 Democratic primary (2010)
Candidates	Votes	Percent	
Elizabeth M. Coggs (D)
2,613	66.45%	
Stephanie Findley (D)	1,039	26.42%	
Sherman L. Hill (D)	268	6.82%	

Campaign themes
According to Coggs' campaign website, her focus is on faith, hope and harmony.[8]

Committee assignments
2011-2012
In the 2011-2012 legislative session, Coggs served on these committees:
Aging and Long-Term Care Committee
Consumer Protection Committee
Urban and Local Affairs Committee

State Senate
In 2012, instead of running for re-election to the Assembly, she chose to run for the vacant Sixth District State Senate seat previously held by her cousin Spencer Coggs. Her July 2012 call to the mostly-black voters at an inner-city candidate forum to "vote for someone who looks like you" led to accusations that she was attacking Assemblywoman Sandy Pasch, the only white candidate in the race to replace Coggs in her 10th Assembly district seat (Pasch's current seat was eliminated by the Republican-led legislature during the most recent redistricting, and she had moved into the new 10th district). All her opponents were African-American, but several African-American candidates at the forum decried her remarks as racist. None of Pasch's opponents had held elected office. "I don't think anyone should vote for anyone on account of their skin color", opponent Ieshuh Griffin said of Coggs' remarks. "It's not about color."

Coggs' predecessor, Polly Williams, describing Pasch as "a White suburban woman" who "can't win in her own district", expressed concern that inner-city seats such as hers could be lost to white Democrats due to alleged machinations by "non-Black forces from outside the community". She lost the Democratic primary (tantamount to election in this inner-city seat) to County Supervisor Nikiya Harris. The 10th district Democratic nomination was taken by Pasch, with over 60% of the vote.

Personal life
Elizabeth Coggs was married to Wendell Jones (they divorced in 2008), and is the mother of Priscilla, Chloé and Devona. She belongs to the Church of God in Christ. Another cousin, Leon Young, was a state legislator.

References

External links
Official assembly website

African-American state legislators in Wisconsin
African-American women in politics
County supervisors in Wisconsin
Living people
Politicians from Milwaukee
University of Wisconsin–Milwaukee alumni
Democratic Party members of the Wisconsin State Assembly
Women state legislators in Wisconsin
1956 births
Date of birth missing (living people)
21st-century American politicians
21st-century American women politicians
21st-century African-American women
21st-century African-American politicians
20th-century African-American people
20th-century African-American women